For Mazas Prison, see here.

Jacques Féréol Mazas (23 September 1782 – died 26 August 1849) was a French composer, conductor, violinist, and pedagogue.

Biography
Born in Lavaur, Mazas was a pupil of Pierre Baillot at the Paris Conservatoire, from which he received the first prize in 1805. In 1808, he played a violin concerto dedicated to him by Auber. He then performed widely across Europe. In 1831, he accepted the post of first violin at the Théâtre du Palais-Royal. A short time later, he was appointed Directeur des concerts in Orléans, where he directed that city's Opéra Comique theatre. From 1837 to 1841, he was director of the Conservatoire in Cambrai.

He died in Bordeaux.

Music
One of his operas, Le Kiosk had eight performances at the Opéra-Comique in Paris.

His compositions for violin are, for the most part, studies and duets for young string players of all abilities that constitute methods for both violin and viola.

Selected works
 3 Trios for 2 violins and cello (or viola), Op. 18
 La Consolation, Élégie No. 2 in G major for viola and orchestra (or piano), Op. 29 (1831)
 75 Études mélodiques et progressives (in 3 parts), Op. 36
 Études spéciales
 Études brillantes 
 Études d'artistes (considered to be preparation for the 24 Caprices of Paganini) 
 Duets for two violins, Op. 39 
 Six easy duets for two violins dedicated to his pupils, Op. 61 
 Six duets for two violins, Op. 71 
 Élégie in C major for viola or cello and piano, Op. 73 (1838)
 Duet for 2 violins in G minor, Op. 86
 Le Songe (The Dream): Fantasy on a Theme from La favorite (Donizetti), Op. 92 for viola or viola d'amore and piano
 Rondeau du Freischütz (Weber), Op. 44/1 
 Polonaise du Freischütz (Weber), Op. 45/1 
 Polonaise on a theme by Rossini, Op. 45/2 
 Opera: Coxinne au capitole
 Comic opera: Mustapha

External links
 

1782 births
1849 deaths
19th-century classical composers
19th-century French composers
19th-century French male classical violinists
French male classical composers
French opera composers
French Romantic composers
Male opera composers
People from Lavaur, Tarn